Labeo vulgaris is a species of freshwater fish belonging to the genus Labeo. It is endemic to Egypt. It is sometimes considered conspecific with Labeo niloticus.

References

vulgaris
Fish described in 1847